

Elimination round

Postseason

References

Phil
Volley
UAAP Season 57
UAAP volleyball tournaments